The EUR-ACE (European Accredited Engineer) Label is a certificate of quality awarded to degree programmes in Engineering. 

The EUR-ACE label is awarded after authorization from the European Network for Accreditation of Engineering Education (ENAEE). ENAEE grants this authorization to agencies that accredit degree programmes in Engineering in accordance with the  European Qualifications Framework (EQF) standards and with ENAEE standards.

Agencies authorised to award the EUR-ACE label
As of January 2019, the agencies authorised to award the EUR-ACE label are as follows:
 Finland –  FINEEC – Kansallinen Koulutuksen Arviointikeskus Karv
 France – CTI Commission des titres d'ingénieur
 Germany – ASIIN – Fachakkreditierungsagentur für Studiengänge der Ingenieurwissenschaften, der Informatik, der Naturwissenschaften, und der Mathematik
 Ireland –  Engineers Ireland
 Italy – Quacing – Agenzia per la Certificazione di  Qualità e l’Accreditamento EUR-ACE dei Corsi di Studio in Ingegneria
 Kazakhstan – KazSEE – Kazakhstan Society for Engineering Education
 Poland – KAUT – Accreditation Commission of Universities of Technology
 Portugal –  OE Ordem dos Engenheiros
 Romania – ARACIS – The Romanian Agency for Quality Assurance in Higher Education
 Russia – AEER – Association for Engineering Education of Russia
 Slovakia – ZSVTS – Association of Slovak Scientific and Technological Societies
 Spain – ANECA/  IIE – National Agency for Quality Assessment and Accreditation of Spain, with Instituto de la Ingeniería de España
 Switzerland – AAQ –  Agence Suisse d'Accréditation et d'Assurance Qualité
 Turkey –  MÜDEK – Association for Evaluation and Accreditation of Engineering Programmes
 United Kingdom – Engineering Council

EUR-ACE labelled programmes  
As of January 2019, the EUR-ACE label has been awarded to about  3,000 engineering degree programmes in 35 countries both within and outside of Europe.

References

Engineering education
Higher education accreditation
Professional certification in engineering
Education in Europe